Noah Kiprono Ngeny (born 2 November 1978) is a Kenyan former athlete, Olympic gold medalist at 1500 m at the 2000 Summer Olympics, and world record holder in the 1000 m.

Career

Noah was born in the Uasin Gishu District in Kenya. Ngeny played volleyball during his school years and did not start running until 1996.

Ngeny first came to international prominence by setting two world junior records in 1997—3:32.91 for 1500 m in Monaco and 3:50.41 for the Mile in Nice, and under the guidance of renowned manager and coach, the late Kim McDonald, his progression continued in 1998, improving his 1500 m time to 3:30.34 in Monaco.

On 7 July 1999, in Roma, Ngeny was second to Hicham El Guerrouj when the latter set the world record (3:43.13) for the mile run. Ngeny stayed close to El Guerrouj down the stretch to finish at 3:43.40, still the second-fastest mile ever run , and almost a full second inside the old world record (3:44.39) of Noureddine Morceli.

On 24 August 1999, Ngeny took the 1500 m silver medal (3:28.73) in the IAAF 1999 World Championships in Athletics in Seville, Spain, behind the reigning world champion El Guerrouj (3:27.65).

On 5 September 1999, Ngeny set the world record 2:11.96 over 1000 m in Rieti, Italy, breaking the 18-years-standing record 2:12.18 set by Sebastian Coe in 1981. Ngeny's time of 2:11.96 still stands as the world record with only one other runner coming within 2 seconds of the time since (Taoufik Makhloufi). The previous record had been the oldest standing record at the time. It was also the last world record of any running distance that had not been previously held by an athlete of African descent.

In 1999 Ngeny recorded six sub 3:30 clockings for 1500 m and established himself as the closest rival to world champion and world record holder El Guerrouj.

On 11 August 2000, Ngeny finished second to El Guerrouj (3:27.21) in the 1500 m at the Weltklasse Zürich meet in a time of 3:28.12, making him the Kenyan record holder and third-fastest ever in the event. This record was surpassed by Bernard Lagat's 3:26.34 in Brussels on 24 August 2001. Lagat achieved this record when he finished 2nd behind Hicham El Guerrouj (3:26.12).

Sydney triumph
On 29 September 2000, at the 1500 m final of 2000 Sydney Olympics, El Guerrouj, world record holder and twice world champion, had only been defeated once since the previous Olympics, and was the overwhelming favourite. The two rivals led the race going into the last lap of the final, El Guerrouj leading Ngeny. With less than 100 m to go, Ngeny started moving next to the leader, grabbing the lead with just 15 m to go. He held on until the finish line, causing one of the greatest upsets at the Sydney Olympics.

In the process, Ngeny set an Olympic record of 3:32.07, surpassing Sebastian Coe's Olympic record of 3:32.53, set in 1984. El Guerrouj settled for silver in 3:32.32 and Ngeny's compatriot Bernard Lagat, another Kenyan runner at that time, later a US citizen, took bronze in 3:32.44.

Ngeny became the third Kenyan to win the 1500 m crown following Kip Keino (1968 Mexico City Olympics) and Peter Rono (1988 Seoul Olympics).

The year 2000 was the highlight of Ngeny's running career. He posted career bests of 1:44.49 for 800 m (28 July 2000 in Oslo) and 3:28.12 for 1500 m (at the Weltklasse Zürich on 11 August 2000), en route to his Olympic triumph (29 September 2000).

As of October 2019, his career best time of 3:28.12 at Zürich makes him the sixth-fastest 1500 m runner of all time, behind El Guerrouj, Lagat, Noureddine Morceli, Silas Kiplagat and Asbel Kiprop.

After Sydney
Ngeny was dropped from the Kenyan team for the 2001 World Championships in Edmonton after defying instructions from the national federation to return home from Britain where he trains.

Ngeny returned to Australia in 2001 to win the Goodwill Games Mile in Brisbane. A car crash in Kenya in November of that year put him out of action for much of the winter. The injury sustained in the car accident (injury to the back and pelvis) dogged Ngeny ever since. He competed sparsely in 2003 and 2004 recording a best time of 3:33.38 but failing in his attempt to qualify for the Kenyan Olympic team, and was not able to defend his title in Athens. Ngeny did not run at the Kenyan trials for the 2003 World Championships because of the injuries.

Ngeny announced his official retirement from international athletics on 22 November 2006.

After retirement, he has been an athletics coach for Kenya Defence Forces.

Ngeny would eventually become an athletes' representative for Kenya. In 2016, he quit his post in protest of the poor response of Kenyan representatives to a doping crisis.

Personal bests

References

External links
 
 The Standard, 14 May 2006: Electric Ngeny plots comeback
 Pace Sports Management

1978 births
Living people
People from Uasin Gishu County
Kenyan male middle-distance runners
Olympic athletes of Kenya
Olympic gold medalists for Kenya
Athletes (track and field) at the 2000 Summer Olympics
World Athletics Championships athletes for Kenya
World Athletics Championships medalists
World Athletics record holders
Medalists at the 2000 Summer Olympics
Olympic gold medalists in athletics (track and field)
Goodwill Games medalists in athletics
Competitors at the 2001 Goodwill Games
Goodwill Games gold medalists in athletics